The 1983–84 Winnipeg Jets season was the 12th season of the Winnipeg Jets, their fifth season in the National Hockey League. The Jets placed fourth in the Smythe to qualify for the playoffs. The Jets lost to the Edmonton Oilers in the first round.

Offseason
On June 8, 1983, the Jets traded former team captain Dave Christian to the Washington Capitals for the Capitals first round draft pick in the 1983 NHL Entry Draft.  Christian, who lost his captaincy midway through the 1982-83 season, had 79 goals and 209 points in 230 games with Winnipeg since breaking into the NHL one week after winning the gold medal with the 1980 US Olympic Team.

At the 1983 NHL Entry Draft, the Jets first selection was with the eighth overall pick, and the team drafted winger Andrew McBain from the North Bay Centennials of the OHL.  McBain had 33 goals and 120 points with the Centennials in the 1982-83 season.  Six picks later, at 14th overall, which the Jets had acquired from the Washington Capitals in the Dave Christian trade, Winnipeg selected defenseman Bobby Dollas from the Laval Voisins of the QMJHL.  Dollas had 16 goals and 61 points with Laval during the 1982-83 season.  Later, in the fourth round, the Jets selected goaltender Bob Essensa from the Henry Carr Crusaders Jr. B team.

The Jets made a few minor transactions during the off-season, trading Norm Dupont to the Hartford Whalers for the Whalers fourth round draft pick in the 1984 NHL Entry Draft, and releasing Bryan Maxwell and Larry Hopkins.  The Jets biggest trade was acquiring Tim Young from the Minnesota North Stars for Craig Levie and Tom Ward.  Young spent eight seasons with the North Stars, and had 18 goals and 53 points in 70 games with Minnesota during the 1982-83 season.

Regular season

Final standings

Schedule and results

Playoffs
For the second year in a row, the Jets were swept in 3 games by the Edmonton Oilers, in the Division semi-finals.

Player statistics

Regular season
Scoring

Goaltending

Playoffs
Scoring

Goaltending

Awards and records

Transactions

Trades

Waivers

Free agents

Draft picks
Winnipeg selected the following players at the 1983 NHL Entry Draft, which was held at the Montreal Forum in Montreal, Quebec on June 8, 1983.

NHL Amateur Draft

Farm teams
Sherbrooke Jets

See also
 1983–84 NHL season

References

External links

Winnipeg Jets season, 1983-84
Winnipeg Jets (1972–1996) seasons
Winn